Nihat Hatipoğlu (born 11 May 1955 in Diyarbakır, Turkey) is a Turkish academician and theologian.

Biography 
Nihat Hatipoğlu was born in Diyarbakır on 11 May 1955. He completed his primary education in Malatya and Kayseri. He studied in an Imam-Hatip High School and graduated from Ankara University.

Criticism 
It was claimed that Nihat Hatipoğlu was receiving 600,000 monthly for his program, which was broadcast on ATV during Ramadan in 2014, and lived in a villa with a pool. Hatipoğlu responded to the rumors by saying, "I have been living in the same house in Keçiören for 20 years. I have neither a villa, nor a pool, nor a pit in front of my house that can get filled with water during rainfall. The claim that I received 600 thousand per month from ATV is a lie."

In August 2014, Turkey's first atheism association Ateizm Derneği filed a criminal complaint with allegations of inciting hatred and hostility and marginalization against Hatipoğlu following his remarks on an ATV program, during which he said: "The greatest father to atheists is the devil, meaning that the devil is actually much cleaner than they are." Hatipoğlu stated in his defense that he had in fact "displayed an embracing attitude towards atheists". The prosecutor's office rejected the case on the grounds that the statements were not intended for individuals but for ideas.

In May 2019, Hatipoğlu made a 13-year-old Christian Armenian child a Muslim during the iftar program on ATV. Hatipoğlu claimed that he had the permission of the child's family for this, while the family's friends said that the children were supposed to go to an outdoor program to eat dinner. The incident sparked reactions and criticism about violating children's rights.

Books authored 
 İnsanlığın Geleceği ve İslam, 1988
 İslami Davetin İlkeleri, 1988
 Fitneler, 1997
 Ashapdan Bir Demet, 1997
 Bazı Hadislerin Günümüze Yansıması, 1997
 Ayetlere Farklı Bir Bakış, 1997
 Asr-ı Saadette Müşrik ve Münafık Liderler, 1999
 Kur'an-ı Kerim'in Anlaşılmasında Hadislerin Rolü, 1999
 Ebu Zür'a er-Razi ve Hadis İlmindeki Yeri, 2000
 Hz. Peygamberle İslam'ı Doğru Anlamak, 2006
 Saadet Asrından Damlalar, 2008
 Sevgi Dininden Yansımalar, 2009
 Dört Halife, 2010
 Gökteki Yıldızlar, 2010
 O'nu Nasıl Sevdiler, 2010
 Nihat Hatipoğlu'nun Kaleminden Günlük Dualar, 2010
 Barış Elçisinden Rahmet Dokunuşları, 2010
 Allah'ı Bildiğimi Sanırdım, 2011
 Rahmete Firar Etmek, 2011
 Büyüklerin Duaları, 2011
 Kur'an ve Sünnet Işığında Felaketler ve Deprem, 2011
 Hz. Peygamber ile Kur’an’ı Doğru Anlamak, 2015

References 

1955 births
Living people
People from Diyarbakır
Turkish theologians